Philip Gabriel Gould (born 28 February 1957) is a British drummer, songwriter and singer from the Isle of Wight in southern England. He founded the band Level 42 with Mark King.

Career
Gould was born in Hong Kong, and studied percussion at the Royal Academy of Music in London, where he met keyboardist Mike Lindup. Gould's first foray into the charts came with pop group M, drumming on their single "Pop Muzik", a number one single in the United States, and No. 2 hit in the UK. Gould also appeared on Top of the Pops with Roxy Music for their performance of "More Than This" and also in their promo video for this song.

Together with Mike Lindup, Mark King and Gould's guitarist brother Boon, he formed Level 42 and had several major hits, writing many of the lyrics and co-writing many songs. Their biggest selling albums were World Machine and Running in the Family. In 1987, the Gould brothers left Level 42, Phil citing nervous exhaustion and being unhappy with their new pop sound. Gould became a respected session musician.

Gould briefly returned as a studio drummer and principal lyricist on 1994's Forever Now album. However, dismayed by the record company's incompetence, he did not go on the road with the band for their Forever Now tour, and was quickly replaced as a live drummer by Gavin Harrison.

In 2007, Gould contributed to the debut album Escapizm by Italian singer Diana Winter, co-writing and producing the tracks "Rain" and "Dream Alone", and playing drums. In 2009, Gould released his first solo album Watertight on the Bongo Saloon label. The album features contributions from Mike Lindup, Wally Badarou and Berenice Scott. In January 2009, Gould finally released the album Terraforming under the group name of Gould, Brown and Black. The album was initially made available via iTunes with a view to a CD release later in the year. In November 2013, Gould was busy with The-Bongo-Saloon project.

Discography

With M 
1979: New York • London • Paris • Munich
1980: The Official Secrets Act

With Level 42 
1981: Level 42
1982: Strategy / The Early Tapes
1982: The Pursuit of Accidents
1983: Standing in the Light
1984: True Colours
1985: World Machine
1987: Running in the Family
1994: Forever Now

With Gould, Brown and Black
2009: Terraforming

Solo
2009: Watertight
2021: Beautiful Wounds

References

External links
https://www.philgouldmusic.com/
Level 42 official website; accessed 26 September 2014.
 
 

1957 births
Living people
English drummers
English new wave musicians
British male drummers
Level 42 members
Musicians from the Isle of Wight